Supreme Council may refer to:

Culture 
 Supreme Council of Antiquities, part of the Egyptian Ministry of Culture
 Supreme Council of Ethnic Hellenes, a non-profit organisation in Greece established in 1997

Freemasonry 
 Supreme Council, Scottish Rite (Southern Jurisdiction, USA)
 Supreme Council, Scottish Rite, Northern Jurisdiction, USA

Religion 
 Islamic Supreme Council of America, a Muslim religious organization in the United States
 Supreme Islamic Shia Council, Lebanese Shia high authority in Lebanon
 Supreme Muslim Council, the highest body in charge of Muslim community affairs in Palestine under British control
 Sangha Supreme Council, the governing body of the Buddhist order of Thailand

Military 
 Supreme Defence Council (Bahrain), Bahrain's highest defense authority
 Supreme War Council, a central command created by British Prime Minister David Lloyd George to coordinate Allied military strategy during World War I
 Supreme War Council (Japan), a council that was established during the development of representative government in Meiji period Japan

Politics and government

Belarus 
 Supreme Council of Belarus, the first National Parliament of Belarus in the post-Soviet era

Georgia 
 Supreme Council of the Republic of Georgia, the first National Parliament of the Republic of Georgia in the post-Soviet era
 Supreme Council of the Autonomous Republic of Adjara, a local parliament in Adjara, Georgia

Iraq 
 Islamic Supreme Council of Iraq, an Iraqi political party

Lebanon 
 Supreme Council (Lebanon), a judicial body for trying certain impeachment cases

Kazakhstan 
 Supreme Council of Kazakhstan, the first National Parliament of Kazakhstan in the post-Soviet era

Kyrgyzstan 
 Supreme Council (Kyrgyzstan), the parliament of Kyrgyzstan

Latvia 
 Supreme Council of Latvia, the first National Parliament of Latvia in the post-Soviet era

Lithuania 
 Supreme Council of Lithuania, the first National Parliament of Lithuania in the post-Soviet era

Moldova 
 Supreme Council (Transnistria), the parliament of Transnistria

Poland 
 Supreme National Council, the central civil government of Poland loyal to the Kościuszko Insurrection, created 1794

Romania 
 Supreme Council of National Defence (Romania), the autonomous administrative authority in Romania

Siam 
 Supreme Council of State of Siam (now defunct), a body of advisors to King Prajadhipok of Siam from 1925 to 1932

Russia and the Soviet Union 
 Supreme Privy Council, a body of advisors to Catherine I
 Supreme Soviet of the Soviet Union, the national legislature of the former Soviet Union
 Supreme Soviet of Russia, former national legislature of Russia (1938–1993)

South Korea 
 Supreme Council for National Reconstruction, a military junta 1961–1963

Ukraine and Crimea 
 Verkhovna Rada, Supreme Council of Ukraine, the parliament of Ukraine
 Verkhovna Rada of Crimea, Supreme Council of Crimea, the parliament of the Autonomous Republic of Crimea, Ukraine
 Ukrainian Supreme Liberation Council, a Ukrainian political organisation formed in July 1944
 Supreme Ruthenian Council

United States 
 Supreme Executive Council of the Commonwealth of Pennsylvania, a council of the Pennsylvania State government prior to the adoption of the 1790 constitution

United Arab Emirates 
 Federal Supreme Council of the United Arab Emirates

Uzbekistan 
 Supreme Council of Uzbekistan, the first National Parliament of Uzbekistan in the post-Soviet era

Yemen 
 Supreme Political Council, an executive body formed by Houthi Ansarullah and the General People's Congress to rule Yemen

Other uses 
 Supreme Council for Women, Bahrain’s advisory body to the government on women's issues
 Supreme Council of ICT of Iran, the main council in Iran for ICT affairs
 Supreme National Security Council, the National Security Council of the Islamic Republic of Iran
 Supreme Economic Council, established at the Paris Peace Conference in February 1919
 Supreme Petroleum Council

See also 
 Supreme Electoral Council (disambiguation)
 Supreme Military Council (disambiguation)
 Supreme People's Council (disambiguation)
 Revolutionary Council (disambiguation)
 Soviet (disambiguation)
 Supreme Soviet
 The Big Four (World War I), the four top Allied powers of the World War I, also known as the Council of Four